Han Kyeong-hwa (born 1977) is a South Korean voice actress. She joined the Munhwa Broadcasting Corporation's voice acting division in 2004.

Roles

Broadcast television 
Story Tour(MBC)
24 (TV series)(Korea TV Edition, MBC)
Smallville (TV series)(Korea TV Edition, MBC)
CSI: Crime Scene Investigation(Korea TV Edition, MBC)
CSI: Miami(Korea TV Edition, MBC)

See also
Munhwa Broadcasting Corporation
MBC Voice Acting Division

Homepage
MBC Voice Acting Division Han Kyeong Hwa Blog(in Korean)

South Korean voice actresses
1977 births
Living people
21st-century South Korean actresses